"Pieces" is a song written and recorded by Canadian band Sum 41. "Pieces" was released to radio on November 15, 2004, as the second single from the band's third studio album, Chuck (2004).

Music video
The video shows lead vocalist Deryck Whibley singing while he miserably walks throughout an abandoned community. Trucks with one clear side pass behind him, showing the other band members inside of them with signs labeling them as having "the perfect vacation", "the perfect night", "the perfect family", and "the perfect body." In the end, there is a truck with Whibley sitting alone in a sparsely furnished room labelled "the perfect life". At the end of the music video, the letter "F" from the word "life" labelled on the truck falls off, which leaves him with a sign labelled as "the perfect lie".

In an interview with Fuse TV, Whibley explained the letter "F" falling off of the truck's sign turned out both an ironic and unintended result. But since it fit in with their video's theme, they decided to use it anyway.

Drummer Steve Jocz stated that they wanted a semi-serious video. "The song is about a relationship, but not necessarily one with a girl. Maybe you're better left alone — fuck everybody else. The last single [We're All to Blame] was a pretty serious song, too, but we wanted to offset it with a funny video. With this one, we don't want it to be too hokey, but we don't want it to be too serious either. The trick is to make it interesting while playing up the fact that it is a sincere, genuine song."

Track listing
 "Pieces" (album version)
 "Pieces" (acoustic)
 "We're All to Blame" (album version)
 "Pieces" (video)

Charts

Release history

References

External links
 

Sum 41 songs
2004 singles
2004 songs
Island Records singles
Music videos directed by Brett Simon
Songs written by Deryck Whibley
Songs written by Greig Nori